The completo (Spanish for "complete", "total") is a hot dog variation eaten in Chile, usually served with ingredients such as chopped tomatoes, avocados, mayonnaise, sauerkraut, salsa Americana, ají pepper and green sauce. It can be twice the size of an American hot dog.

History

Origins

The dish was first made in the 1920s in the fuentes de soda (soda fountains) of central Santiago. The completo was brought to Chile by Eduardo Bahamondes who had recently travelled to the United States on business. It was there that he first saw the "hot dog" which he decided to bring back to his home country. Once back in Chile, he then opened a restaurant in Santiago's historic centre called Quick Lunch Bahamondes where he began to introduce the Chilean people to the hot dog.

Recipe

Ingredients
Most completos contain some or all of the following ingredients:

Avocado - Not to be confused with guacamole, traditionally only salt is added to the avocado puree before it is put on the completo.
Tomato - Fresh tomato is a favourite in Chile. Typically tomatoes are peeled before they are diced for completos. 
Mayonnaise - Chile is the country with the third highest consumption of mayonnaise per capita on earth. It is therefore a very popular completo topping. Completo mayo in Chile tends to be house made as this remains the preferred method of preparation by Chileans. 
Sauerkraut - Introduced to Chile by the large wave of German immigrants it received in the 19th century, sauerkraut is now completely accepted as being a staple food in Chilean cuisine. It is popularly called chucrut. 
Salsa Americana - A form of relish, what is commonly referred to as americana is a finely chopped or blended mixture of pickle, pickled carrot and pickled onion.

Variations

Throughout Chile, specific names are used to describe the different variations of completos: 
Completo: Sometimes referred as completo-completo in order to differentiate it from the other variants, it's the most traditional version. Its ingredients include chopped tomatoes, mayonnaise (a large amount), sauerkraut and salsa americana.
Completo Italiano or simply Italiano: topped with chopped tomatoes, mashed avocados and mayonnaise, this variation is widely viewed as the most popular. The name comes from its resemblance with the colors of the Italian flag.
Dinámico ("Dynamic"): A mix of the aforementioned ingredients (tomatoes, avocados, mayonnaise and sauerkraut) or salsa Americana.
Completo A lo Pobre ("Poor man's completo"): Made with fried onion, french fries and a fried egg on top of the hot dog. The "poor man's" in the name is due to the fact that the main ingredients are the same of bistec a lo pobre a main dish historically favoured by low wage workers.
Tomate mayo ("Tomato-mayo"): As its name suggests, it is a version with only chopped tomatoes and mayonnaise.

Similar international versions
The completo is also a type of hot dog eaten in Brazil, which generally includes mayonnaise, ketchup, mustard, corn, peas, tomatoes, onions, Parmesan cheese and fries. In São Paulo, it is common to add mashed potatoes. Common extra fillings include chicken, cream cheese, ground meat and olives.

See also
Barros Jarpa
Barros Luco
Choripán
Chorrillana
Dominó
 List of hot dogs
Longaniza
Sonoran hot dog

References

Chilean cuisine
Hot dogs